Juan Simón's Daughter (Spanish:La hija de Juan Simón) is a 1935 Spanish musical drama film directed by Nemesio M. Sobrevila and José Luis Sáenz de Heredia. It is based on the musical play La hija de Juan Simón by Sobrevila. A second film version Juan Simón's Daughter was released in 1957.

Cast
 Angelillo as Ángel
 Pilar Muñoz as Carmen
 Carmen Amaya as Soledad
 Manuel Arbó as Juan Simón
 Ena Sedeño as Angustias
 Porfiria Sanchíz as La Roja
 Fernando Freyre de Andrade as Don Paco
 Emilio Portes as Don Severo
 Baby Daniels as Cupletista
 Julián Pérez Ávila as The Physician
 Pablo Hidalgo as Curro
 Palanca as Cantaor
 Emilia Iglesias as Ángel's mother
 Cándida Losada as Trini
 Felisa Torres as Celes
 Rafaela Aparicio as Gregoria
 Luis Buñuel
 Luisa Sala

References

Bibliography 
  Eva Woods Peiró. White Gypsies: Race and Stardom in Spanish Musical Films. U of Minnesota Press, 2012.

External links 
 

1930s musical drama films
Spanish musical drama films
1935 films
1930s Spanish-language films
Films directed by José Luis Sáenz de Heredia
Spanish black-and-white films
1935 drama films